Mehdi Namli (born 23 June 1987) is a Moroccan footballer who plays for KAC Kénitra as an attacking midfielder.

Career
Namli previously played for Moroccan side Olympique Safi. He signed a two-year contract with Ligue 2 club Clermont Foot in July 2010.

References

External links
Profile at footballdatabase.eu

1987 births
Living people
People from Safi, Morocco
Association football wingers
Moroccan footballers
Moroccan expatriate footballers
Olympic Club de Safi players
Clermont Foot players
Moghreb Tétouan players
KAC Kénitra players
Botola players
Ligue 2 players
Moroccan expatriate sportspeople in France
Expatriate footballers in France